The 2017 Pro Bowl (branded as the 2017 Pro Bowl presented by Aquafina for sponsorship reasons) was the National Football League's all-star game for the 2016 season, which was played at Camping World Stadium in Orlando, Florida, on January 29, 2017. The game was the first in a three-year deal to host the Pro Bowl in Orlando, which also included cross-promotional events (such as a newly established skills competition) held at the Walt Disney World Resort (which is owned by the primary parent company of the game's broadcaster, ESPN).

After three years of using a draft format, the 2017 Pro Bowl returned to the previous conference-based format, played between all-star teams representing the American Football Conference and National Football Conference. The AFC all-stars were coached by Andy Reid, and the NFC all-stars were coached by Jason Garrett.

Background

Host selection process
At least five locations were in contention to host the 2017 Pro Bowl, with four submitting formal bids.
Aloha Stadium in Hawaii, the site of the Pro Bowl from 1980 to 2009, 2011–2014, and 2016.
NRG Stadium in Houston, Texas, the site of Super Bowl LI.
Camping World Stadium in Orlando, Florida, where Pro Bowl rightsholder ESPN has operations at Walt Disney World.
An unidentified stadium in Sydney, New South Wales, Australia.
Maracanã Stadium in Rio de Janeiro, Brazil. The stadium, which had recently been renovated for the 2014 FIFA World Cup and 2016 Summer Olympics, was discussed as a potential hosting site for the event, but Brazil ultimately declined to place a bid.

On June 1, 2016, the NFL announced that it had awarded the next three Pro Bowl games to Orlando.

Side events 
Commissioner Roger Goodell announced that the 2017 Pro Bowl would be a "week-long celebration for football and our fans"; a number of family-oriented side events was held at the Walt Disney World Resort and its ESPN Wide World of Sports Complex, including practices, a 5K run, youth events, and player appearances.

On December 12, 2016, the NFL announced that it would hold a series of skills competitions during Pro Bowl week at the Wide World of Sports Complex, known as the Pro Bowl Skills Showdown.

Game format
On June 1, 2016, the NFL confirmed that the Pro Bowl would return to its previous, conference-based format for 2017, after three years of using a draft-based format with players selected by designated captains. The captains were former NFL players Jerome Bettis, Tony Gonzalez, Ray Lewis, and Charles Woodson.

Rule changes
The game format was nearly the same for 2017 as it had been in 2016, with some exceptions:
Forty-four players were assigned to each team, up from 43 in 2016 (a regular game-day active roster has 46).
The two-minute warning that was given in the first and third quarters (in addition to the second and fourth quarters) in previous years was eliminated, and the ball did not change hands after the first and third quarters.
The coin toss determined which team was awarded possession first. There were no kickoffs; the ball was placed on the 25-yard line at the start of each half and after scoring plays.
Defenses were now permitted to play cover two and press coverage. Prior to 2014, only man coverage was allowed, except for goal line situations.
A 38-second/25-second play clock was used instead of the usual 40-second/25-second clock, and up from 35-second/25-second clock in 2016.
Replay reviews will be allowed; previously there was replay in the Pro Bowl only when new equipment tests were being conducted.
There are no intentional grounding rules.
Only defensive ends and tackles may rush on passing plays, but those must be on the same side of the ball. The defense is not permitted to blitz.
All blindside blocks and blocks below the waist are illegal.
A tight end and running back must be in every formation.
No more than two wide receivers on either side of the ball.
Deep middle safety must be aligned inside the hash marks.

Summary

Box score

AFC rosters
The following players were selected to represent the AFC:

Offense

Defense

Special teams

NFC rosters
The following players were selected to represent the NFC:

Offense

Defense

Special teams

Notes:
bold player who participated in game
Replacement selection due to injury or vacancy
Injured player; selected but will not play
Replacement starter; selected as reserve
Selected but did not play because his team advanced to Super Bowl LI (see Pro Bowl "Player Selection" section)
Players must have accepted their invitations as alternates to be listed; those who declined, such as Tyrod Taylor, are not considered Pro Bowlers

Number of selections per team

Broadcasting
The game was televised nationally by ESPN and broadcast via radio by Westwood One.

References

External links
 Official website

2017
2016 National Football League season
2017 in American football
2017 in sports in Florida
2010s in Orlando, Florida
American football in Orlando, Florida
January 2017 sports events in the United States
Sports competitions in Orlando, Florida